Intense Tropical Cyclone Geralda was a powerful tropical cyclone that caused catastrophic damage in Madagascar in late January 1994, among the strongest to hit the country. It was also the most intense tropical cyclone worldwide in 1994. Cyclone Geralda originated from an area of low pressure over the Indian Ocean on 25 January. Over the following few days, the depression underwent gradual intensification, reaching its peak intensity with ten-minute sustained winds of 200 km/h (125 mph) on 31 January. It eventually made landfall near Toamasina, Madagascar after weakening from its peak intensity, and substantially weakened within hours of moving onshore. By 5 February, Geralda had degenerated into a land depression, and became extratropical three days later. Geralda's remnants dissipated on 12 February.

Geralda was the second cyclone in as many months to strike eastern Madagascar, after Daisy in January. The cyclone also dropped heavy rainfall that caused flooding, particularly in valleys. About 80% of the city of Toamasina was destroyed, including most schools, homes, and churches. The cyclone heavily damaged roads and rail lines, which later disrupted relief efforts. In the capital Antananarivo, Geralda killed 43 people after flooding many houses. Overall, more than 40,000 homes were destroyed, leaving 356,000 people homeless. Nationwide, the cyclone killed 231 people and caused over $10 million in damage (1994 USD). Relief work in the storm's aftermath was hampered by lack of coordination, and the Malagasy military were deployed to help storm victims. Few stocks were pre-positioned, causing food prices to rise greatly. Several countries and departments of the United Nations donated money or supplies to the country.

Meteorological history

In late January 1994, the south Indian Ocean Intertropical Convergence Zone produced widespread convection from the eastern coast of Africa to Indonesia. Late on 25January, the Joint Typhoon Warning Center (JTWC) began monitoring a low-pressure area about halfway between Madagascar and Indonesia, later giving it the designation 13S. The following day, the Météo-France on Réunion (MFR) classified the system as a tropical disturbance. By that time, the system had developed an organized area of convection with curved rainbands and was strengthening quickly; early on 28 January, it developed a central dense overcast. In response, MFR upgraded the system to a moderate tropical storm and named it Geralda. At that time, the storm was moving generally west-southwestward due to a ridge extending from Madagascar to the Mascarene Islands. High water temperatures fueled further development, first into a moderate tropical storm late on 28 January and then into a tropical cyclone 24 hours later. By then, the JTWC had upgraded Geralda to the equivalent of a minimal hurricane.

Continuing generally to the west-southwest, Geralda intensified further, and MFR upgraded it to intense tropical cyclone status on 30 January. At 0600 UTC on 31 January, the JTWC estimated peak 1–minute sustained winds of 270 km/h (165 mph), equivalent to a Category 5 hurricane on the Saffir-Simpson scale. Six hours later, Geralda's appearance on satellite imagery warranted a Dvorak rating of 7.0. Geralda had intensified from a tropical disturbance to its peak intensity in only five days, which was described by MFR as "an exceptional phenomenon".

After maintaining its peak winds for about 18 hours, Geralda weakened slightly while approaching eastern Madagascar. At 0600 UTC on 2 February, MFR estimated the winds were around 175 km/h (110 mph). Officials considered Geralda the strongest storm to hit the country since a cyclone in March 1927. Geralda weakened rapidly over the mountainous terrain of Madagascar, passing over the capital Antananarivo late on 2 February; both the JTWC and MFR had downgraded the cyclone to tropical depression status by the next day. About 30 hours after its first landfall, Geralda briefly emerged into the Mozambique Channel late on 3 February. However, a trough soon turned it to the south, and Geralda crossed over western Madagascar, reaching open waters on 5 February. By that time, the winds had decreased to 45 km/h (30 mph). An approaching polar trough turned Geralda to the southeast on 6 February, and the cyclone became extratropical two days later. However, MFR continued tracking the remnants of Geralda until 12 February.

Impact and aftermath

Tromelin Island was the first landmass affected by Geralda.

Cyclone Geralda struck Madagascar just weeks after Tropical Cyclone Daisy affected the same general area. While Geralda was approaching the country, officials declared Emergency Phase 3 for Toamasina Province, indicating immediate danger, and Emergency Phase 1 for Antananarivo, which is a general alert.

The storm also dropped heavy rainfall that caused landslides and severe flooding, mostly in Toamasina Province. About 80% of the city of Toamasina was destroyed, including the country's only petroleum refinery at the time. Damage to the refinery alone was estimated at $800,000.

An early estimate indicated that 95% of schools, homes, and churches sustained severe damage to complete destruction in the city, leaving 50,000 people homeless. In the harbor at Toamasina, Geralda sank seven ships, and throughout the city, power outages and road damage were commonplace. Elsewhere in Madagascar, Geralda wrecked houses and bridges in Fénérive. On Île Sainte-Marie, all power lines and 90% of plantations were destroyed. Lack of basic repairs before the storm contributed to roads and bridges being washed away there. The cyclone killed 43 people when it flooded large portions of Antananarivo, leaving 60,000 people homeless. High rainfall damaged houses in the city and cut off roads outside of the city. Damage was heavy in valleys where flash flooding occurred. The combined impact of Geralda and earlier Cyclone Daisy damaged or destroyed more than 40,000 homes, leaving at least 356,000 people homeless. The storms also left severe damage to roads and rail systems. A total of 20 national roads and several secondary roads were disrupted. The rail line between Moramanga near the capital and Brickaville near the coast was damaged. Overall, Cyclone Geralda killed at least 231 people, with 73 missing as of MFR's annual cyclone report on the season; the storm also injured 267 people and caused over $10 million in damage (1994 USD).

In the aftermath, there was no pre-existing method of dealing with a storm of such magnitude, and most local governments failed to respond immediately due to lack of coordination. As a result, agencies spent much time in dealing with the logistics of the aftermath. There were few food supplies that were pre-positioned.  The Malagasy government worked with the United Nations to create a committee, which met weekly and addressed various facets of the recovery. Malagasy officials deployed members of the military to help storm victims, although damaged roads initially hampered relief efforts. Due to crop damage, the price of rice increased by 300% in the country, and there were food shortages in Antananarivo, along with fuel shortages elsewhere. In Toamasina, industrial activity was expected to take six months to resume production. Médecins Sans Frontières helped assure the cleanliness of shelters in Antananarivo, while CARE delivered food to residents in Brickaville. There were health issues related to the widespread flooding, prompting the government to distribute medical supplies for 60,000 people. Shortly after Geralda struck, the Malagasy government requested international assistance. The United Nations Department of Human Services provided an emergency $30,000 relief grant, and UNICEF later provided about $2.3 million in assistance. The European Union provided about $560,000 worth of medicine and relief. The French government sent $5 million worth of supplies via airplane from Réunion, including food and medicine. Eight other countries sent assistance in the form of money or relief items.

By about two weeks after the storm's landfall, water and power service were being restored in Toamasina, although by that time, 40% of the communications network remained offline. By 16 February, the road from Antananrivo and Toamasina had been reopened. The Malagasy government imported oil for several months while its refinery was out of order. Non-government organizations provided rice to stabilize prices. The damaged rail line between Antananarivo and the coast was rebuilt in 2003. Schools that were repaired following Geralda were later successfully used as shelters.

See also

Cyclone Honorinina – Powerful cyclone in 1984 that took a similar track, killing 99 people
Cyclone Gafilo – Powerful cyclone in 2004 that took a similar track, killing 237 people
Cyclone Batsirai – Powerful cyclone in 2022

Notes

References

1993–94 South-West Indian Ocean cyclone season
Cyclones in Madagascar
Intense Tropical Cyclones